-cide is a suffix that means killing.

Cide or CIDE may also refer to:

Places
 Cide, a town in Turkey
 Cide Palace (disambiguation), several places in Taiwan

Arts, entertainment, and media
 Cide Hamete Benengeli, a fictional character in Don Quixote
CIDE-FM, a Canadian radio station in Sioux Lookout, Ontario
Collaborative International Dictionary of English, or CIDE

Organizations
Centro de Investigación y Docencia Económicas, or CIDE, a research and teaching facility in Mexico City
Coordinación de Informaciones de Estado, or CIDE, a defunct Argentine intelligence agency

See also 
 List of types of killing
 Side (disambiguation)